The following table shows the European record progression in the men's 800 metres, as ratified by the EAA

Hand timing 

(*) Performance timed over 880 yards

Automatic timing

References 

800 m
European record
European 800 metres record